Open Hardware License may refer to:
 TAPR Open Hardware License
 CERN Open Hardware License
 Solderpad Hardware License, modified Apache2 to encompass design as well as copyright

See also 
 Open-source hardware